Harrison Ruffin Tyler (born November 9, 1928) is an American chemical engineer, businessperson, and preservationist. He cofounded ChemTreat, Inc., a water treatment company, in 1968 and restored the Sherwood Forest Plantation. He is a son of Lyon Gardiner Tyler as well as the last living grandchild of former U.S. president John Tyler, and speaks on the history of the Tyler family. Tyler purchased Fort Pocahontas in 1996 and advocates for its preservation.

Early life and education 
Harrison Ruffin Tyler was born on November 9, 1928 to Susan Ruffin and Lyon Gardiner Tyler. His paternal grandparents were Julia Gardiner and John Tyler. Through his mother, he is a great-grandson of Edmund Ruffin, and a descendant of Benjamin Harrison IV, Robert Carter I and Pocahontas. She was a teacher and caretaker of the family's historical documents. Despite his familial connections, Tyler grew up poor during the Great Depression.

Tyler, whose father died when he was a boy, was homeschooled by his mother and then attended Charles City County public schools. He briefly attended St. Christopher's School. Possibly through Lyon's friendship with Franklin D. Roosevelt, Nancy Astor, Viscountess Astor funded Tyler's education at the College of William & Mary with a $5,000 check. He graduated with a degree in chemistry in 1949. In 1951, Tyler completed a degree in chemical engineering at Virginia Polytechnic Institute.

Career 
Tyler is a chemical engineer and businessperson. After graduation, he worked as a project manager for Virginia-Carolina Chemical Corporation where he led a plant in Charleston, South Carolina. Tyler became familiar with soft water and learned how to treat hard water when he worked as a start-up engineer for a plant in Cincinnati. He received a patent in water treatment pertaining to shiny aluminum. In 1963, Virginia-Carolina Chemical Corporation was acquired by Mobil. The change in corporate culture prompted Tyler to found ChemTreat, Inc., with partner William P. Simmons. The water treatment company was headquartered in Glen Allen, Virginia. He used chemistry to address problems with industrial water cooling systems. The company worked with hospitals and the paper and pulp sector. In 2000, Tyler led an employee stock ownership program at his company. ChemTreat was acquired by the Danaher Corporation in 2007.

Personal life 
Tyler and Frances Payne Bouknight of Mulberry Hill Plantation, Johnston, South Carolina announced their engagement in 1957. The couple were married from July 1957 until her death on February 8, 2019, and had three children: Julia Gardiner Tyler Samaniego (born 1958), Harrison Ruffin Tyler Jr. (born 1960), and William Bouknight Tyler (born 1961). They resided in Richmond, Virginia.

Tyler is a preservationist. His family purchased the Sherwood Forest Plantation from relatives in 1975 and oversaw its restoration. Tyler spoke publicly of his family's history. In 1996, he purchased and financially supported the preservation of Fort Pocahontas. Beginning in 1997, Tyler sponsored annual American Civil War reenactments at Wilson's Wharf. In 1997, he collaborated with the William & Mary Center for Archaeological Research to assess and research Fort Pocahontas. In 2001, he donated $5 million and 22,000 books and documents from his father to the College of William & Mary department of history. In 2021, the college renamed the department the Harrison Ruffin Tyler Department of History in his honor.

Tyler had a series of mini-strokes starting in 2012 and now has dementia. He lives in a Virginia nursing home and his son William oversees the Sherwood Forest Plantation. His grandfather is the earliest former President of the United States with a living grandchild.

References

Citations

Bibliography

External links 

1928 births
Living people
20th-century American businesspeople
20th-century American engineers
21st-century American businesspeople
21st-century American engineers
American chemical engineers
American company founders
American people of Powhatan descent
Businesspeople from Richmond, Virginia
College of William & Mary alumni
Engineers from Virginia
Gardiner family
Harrison family of Virginia
Historical preservationists
John Tyler family
People with dementia
Ruffin family
Virginia Tech alumni